Who Will Bell the Cat? is a 2018 children's picture book by Patricia McKissack. Based on the fable Belling the Cat, it was published by Holiday House and is illustrated by Christopher Cyr. It concerns a group of mice who nurse back to health an ungrateful terrifying cat called Marmalade, make a bell and collar warning device, and how they manage to collar the cat with it.

Reception
A review in Publishers Weekly of Who Will Bell the Cat? wrote "Lush, cinematic illustrations add drama to the late McKissack’s retelling of Aesop’s classic fable." and Kirkus Reviews, in a starred review, compared it to The Rescuers.

Who Will Bell the Cat? has also been reviewed by Booklist, School Library Journal. The Horn Book Magazine, and BookPage.

It is a 2018 Kirkus Reviews Best Picture Book, and a 2018 Chicago Tribune Best Children's Book of the Year.

References

External links
Library holdings of Who Will Bell the Cat?

2018 children's books
American picture books
Books about cats
Works based on Aesop's Fables